Below is a list of rulers of the Gurma Mossi state of Con, a territory located in present-day Burkina Faso.

List of rulers

See also
Rulers of the Gurma Mossi state of Bilanga
Rulers of the Gurma Mossi state of Bilayanga
Rulers of the Gurma Mossi state of Bongandini
Rulers of the Gurma Mossi state of Macakoali
Rulers of the Gurma Mossi state of Nungu
Rulers of the Gurma Mossi state of Piela
Rulers of the Mossi state of Gurunsi
Rulers of the Mossi state of Gwiriko
Rulers of the Mossi state of Liptako
Rulers of the Mossi state of Tenkodogo
Rulers of the Mossi state of Wogodogo
Rulers of the Mossi state of Yatenga

References

Con